U.S. Bank Building may refer to:

 U.S. Bank Building (Chicago)
 U.S. Bank Building (Sioux Falls)
 U.S. Bank Building (Spokane)

See also
U.S. Bank Center (disambiguation)
U.S. Bank Plaza (disambiguation)
U.S. Bank Tower (disambiguation)